Valentin Betoudji (born 14 February 1991) is a Chadian long-distance runner.

He competed in the men's 5000 metres and men's 10,000 metres events at the 2015 Military World Games held in Mungyeong, South Korea.

In 2018, he competed in the men's half marathon at the 2018 IAAF World Half Marathon Championships held in Valencia, Spain. He finished in 128th place. In the same year, he also competed in the men's 5000 metres event at the 2018 African Championships in Athletics held in Asaba, Nigeria.

In 2019, he finished in 17th place in the men's half marathon at the 2019 African Games held in Rabat, Morocco with a time of 1:10:44. In 2020, he competed in the men's race at the 2020 World Athletics Half Marathon Championships held in Gdynia, Poland.

References

External links 
 

Living people
1991 births
Place of birth missing (living people)
Chadian male long-distance runners
Chadian male marathon runners
Competitors at the 2019 African Games
African Games competitors for Chad